National Route 210 is a national highway of Japan connecting Kurume, Fukuoka and Ōita, Ōita in Japan, with a total length of 136.2 km (84.63 mi).

References

National highways in Japan
Roads in Fukuoka Prefecture
Roads in Ōita Prefecture